Jonas Brignoni dos Santos (born 4 July 1983, in Ibirubá), or simply Jonas, is a Brazilian footballer who plays as a defender. Since June 2019, he plays for Brazilian club Inter de Lages.

Honours

Club
Santo André
Copa Paulista: 2014
Campeonato Paulista Série A2: 2016

References

External links 

 
 Profile on Foot Mercato

Living people
Brazilian people of Italian descent
1983 births
Brazilian footballers
Association football defenders
Campeonato Brasileiro Série C players
Ligue 2 players
US Boulogne players
Esporte Clube Pelotas players
Agremiação Sportiva Arapiraquense players
Grêmio Esportivo Brasil players
Veranópolis Esporte Clube Recreativo e Cultural players
Esporte Clube Santo André players
Guarani FC players
Club Sportivo Sergipe players
Botafogo Futebol Clube (PB) players
Associação Atlética Anapolina players
Esporte Clube Internacional de Lages players